The World Extreme Skiing Championships (WESC) was an extreme skiing competition held from 1991 to 2000 in Valdez, Alaska. It was brought back for one year in 2011 but was discontinued for lack of athlete interest.  Co-founder Karen Davey Stewart died in September 2015.

References

1991 establishments in Alaska
2000 disestablishments in Alaska
Recurring events disestablished in 2000
Recurring sporting events established in 1991
Skiing competitions in the United States
Sports competitions in Alaska
Tourist attractions in Chugach Census Area, Alaska